Lynda Jane Wiseman "Gibbo" Gibson (21 March 1956 – 2 January 2004) was an Australian comedian and actress.

Early life
After being trained at the Nimrod in Sydney, Gibson relocated to Albury–Wodonga to join the Murray River Performing Group in 1981. Gibson relocated to Melbourne four years later and became active in local theatre, stand-up comedy and cabaret.

Career
During the 1990s, Gibson appeared in a number of television programs. Most notably, she played Matron Conniving-Bitch in all 26 episodes of interactive spoof soap opera Let the Blood Run Free, which had been adapted from comedy collective The Blood Group's live stage version.

Other television shows Gibson appeared in include The Big Gig, Good News Week, Li'l Elvis and the Truckstoppers and Blue Heelers. Gibson also had a recurring role as Trish in the final series of Frontline. Gibson also appeared as Evonne—one of Darryl Kerrigan's neighbours in 1997 film The Castle.

In 1993, Gibson appeared alongside Sue Ingleton and Denise Scott in a stand-up comedy show called Women Stand Up!.

In 2001, Gibson appeared in a one-woman show at the Melbourne Fringe Festival called Lynda, It's Not Nasty, centred around her battle with ovarian cancer, and in 2003 appeared alongside Judith Lucy and Denise Scott at the Melbourne International Comedy Festival in Comedy Is Still Not Pretty.

Gibson died at the age of forty-seven on 2 January 2004 following a four-year battle with ovarian cancer. Following her death, the Melbourne International Comedy Festival introduced the "Golden Gibbo Award" in Gibson's honour. In 2007, Gibson was posthumously added to the Victorian Honour Roll of Women.

References

External links

1956 births
2004 deaths
Australian women comedians
Australian film actresses
Australian stand-up comedians
Australian television actresses
Deaths from ovarian cancer
Deaths from cancer in Victoria (Australia)